(also written 2018 XB4) is an Apollo near-Earth asteroid roughly  in diameter. It passed closest approach to Earth on 1 January 2019. Of the asteroids discovered in 2018, it had the highest Palermo scale rating at –3.6. In mid-2019 it was recovered which extended the observation arc to 177 days and was removed from the Sentry Risk Table on 12 June 2019.

With a 42-day observation arc, the Sentry Risk Table showed an estimated 1 in 6200 chance of the asteroid impacting Earth on 22 June 2092. A Monte Carlo simulation using Solex 12 with 1000 clones of the asteroid showed that by 2092 the uncertainty region for  stretched around the entire orbit.

References

External links
 
 

Minor planet object articles (unnumbered)

20190101
20181213